Gokul Medh is an archaeological site in Bangladesh. It is an excavated mound in the village of Gokul in Bogra Sadar Upazila, Bogra, about 2km southwest of Mahasthangarh. It is also known as Lakshindar Medh, as it is known in folklore as the bridal chamber of Behula and Lakshinder, protagonists of a ballad. The mound served as the base of a Buddhist shrine or stupa built in the 7th century AD.

History 
The site was excavated in 1934-36 by archaeologist N. G. Majumdar. The excavation revealed the base of a stupa built in the terraced cellular style of construction. The base consists of 172 tightly-packed blind rectangular cells and arranged in gradually rising tiers to support a polygonal shrine above it. The site features several Terracotta plaques from the late Gupta period as well as a square temple added later in the Sena period. During excavation, a stone-slab was discovered at the center of the shrine, which had twelve shallow depressions surrounding a larger depression at the center containing a tiny gold leaf with the figure of a recumbent bull in relief. This indicates the shrine's use as a Shiva temple at some point.

Gallery

See also
 List of archaeological sites in Bangladesh
 History of Bangladesh

References

Archaeological sites in Bangladesh